Telmatobius mendelsoni is a species of frog in the family Telmatobiidae. It was last seen in 1984 and is believed to be possibly extinct.

References

Telmatobius
Amphibians of Peru
Endemic fauna of Peru
Amphibians described in 2012
Taxa named by William Edward Duellman
Taxa named by Ignacio J. De la Riva